The Mysterious Lady (1928) is a Metro-Goldwyn-Mayer silent film romantic drama, starring Greta Garbo, Conrad Nagel, and Gustav von Seyffertitz, directed by Fred Niblo, and based on the novel War in the Dark by Ludwig Wolff.

The film grossed $543,000 in the USA and $541,000 elsewhere, grossing $1,084,000 worldwide, its profit was $369,000.

Plot
In Vienna, Captain Karl von Raden (Conrad Nagel) purchases a returned ticket to a sold-out opera and finds himself sharing a loge with a lovely woman (Greta Garbo). Though she repulses his first advance, she does spend an idyllic day with him in the countryside, where romance blossoms.

Before Karl can return to duty, his uncle, Colonel Eric von Raden (Edward Connelly), the chief of the secret police, assigns him an important mission to deliver secret plans to officials in Berlin, but he also warns his nephew that the woman he just met is Tania Fedorova, a top Russian spy. Tania surprises Karl, meeting him onboard the train. Here she professes her love to him, but he informs her that he has been deceived, and is well aware that she is a spy. Dejected by his reaction, Tania leaves his compartment.

When the train stops the next morning, Karl wakes up and finds the secret plans have been stolen. As a result, he is court martialed and sentenced to military degradation and imprisonment for treason. However, Colonel von Raden visits him in prison and arranges for his release. He sends his nephew to Warsaw, posing as a Serbian pianist, to seek out the identity of the real traitor and thus exonerate himself.

In Warsaw, by chance, Karl is asked to play at a private party where he once again crosses paths with Tania. She is being escorted by General Boris Alexandroff (Gustav von Seyffertitz), the infatuated head of the Russian Military Intelligence Department. Foolhardily, Karl plays a tune from the opera they attended together. She recognizes it, but does not betray him. As the party goers are leaving, she slips away for a few stolen moments with her love. The jealous Alexandroff suspects their feelings for each other. He hires Karl to play the next day at a ball he is giving at his mansion for Tania's birthday.

While Alexandroff and Tania are alone in his home office, he receives a parcel containing the latest secrets stolen by the traitor, whom he casually identifies as Max Heinrich. Later, Tania steals the documents, gives them to Karl, and sends him out via a secret passage. However, it is all a trap. Alexandroff comes in and tells Tania that what she stole was mere blank paper; he shows her the real documents. He pulls out a gun and announces that he intends to use it on Karl, who has been captured outside. She struggles with Alexandroff and manages to fatally shoot him; the sound goes unheard amidst the merriment of the party. When the guards bring the prisoner, she pretends the general is still alive and wants to see him alone. She and Karl escape with the incriminating documents and get married.

Cast
 Greta Garbo as Tania Fedorova
 Conrad Nagel as Captain Karl von Raden
 Gustav von Seyffertitz as General Boris Alexandroff
 Albert Pollet as Max Heinrich
 Edward Connelly as Colonel Eric von Raden
 Richard Alexander as General's Aide
 Betty Blythe as Opera singer (*uncredited)(per the dvd commentary track Jeffrey Vance and Tony Maietta)

Home media
Warner Home Video released The Mysterious Lady to DVD in 2005 as part of a box set called The Garbo Silents Collection with a music score by Vivek Maddala. The home video version contains an audio commentary track by film historians Jeffrey Vance and Tony Maietta.

References

External links 
 
 
 
 

1928 films
1920s spy films
American romantic drama films
American silent feature films
American spy films
American black-and-white films
Films based on German novels
Films directed by Fred Niblo
Films set in the 1910s
Films set in Vienna
Films set in Warsaw
Metro-Goldwyn-Mayer films
1928 romantic drama films
1920s American films
Silent romantic drama films
Silent American drama films